The 2018 Belgian Super Cup was a football match that took place on 22 July 2018, between the 2017–18 Belgian First Division A winners Club Brugge and Standard Liège, the winners of the 2017–18 Belgian Cup. Club Brugge won the match 2–1. For Club Brugge, the victory meant a record 15th Super Cup. Standard Liège featured for the ninth time. The match was a repetition of the 2016 Belgian Super Cup, when Club Brugge also beat Standard 2–1.

Match

Details

See also
2017–18 Belgian First Division A
2017–18 Belgian Cup

References

2018
Club Brugge KV matches
Standard Liège matches
Supercup
Belgian Super Cup